SoftKey International (originally SoftKey Software Products, Inc.) was a software company founded by Kevin O'Leary in 1986 in Toronto, Ontario. It was known as The Learning Company from 1995 to 1999 after acquiring The Learning Company and taking its name.

SoftKey played a major role in the dissolution of the edutainment industry by the turn of the millennium. Contributing factors include its reduction of the market price by releasing shovelware discs of freeware and shareware, hostile takeovers of major edutainment software companies, reduction of these acquisitions to a skeleton staff, and questionable financial practices to maintain its stock price.

In 1999, the company was acquired by Mattel in what Businessweek called one of "the Worst Deals of All Time". It was subsequently folded into Mattel Interactive, Riverdeep Interactive Learning, and Software MacKiev.

Products 
SoftKey published and distributed CD-ROM-based personal computer software for Windows and Macintosh computers during the late 1980s and 1990s. Its lineup consisted of software intended for home audiences, specifically shovelware discs containing various freeware or shareware game software. The company enjoyed great success by offering "jewel-case only" products, dubbed its "Platinum" line.

As a home and small office software publisher, SoftKey bought the rights to application packages from their authors and distributed them under its own "Key" label. By late 1992, SoftKey was distributing 35 different products in this manner. SoftKey began to develop its own software by 1994, and had branched out to include edutainment games and CD-ROMs in its line of products.

In 1986, SoftKey released specialized graphics package KeyChart for the IBM PC and compatibles, designed to make time-consuming plotting easier. In 1993, it was selling KeyMap, a DOS-only software that offered maps, route planning, and a database tool for annotating maps. Around this time, Computer Associates acquired Easy Tax (DOS) from SoftKey and sold it as Simply Tax.

SoftKey's acquisition of The Learning Company added the Reader Rabbit and Math Rabbit educational video games to its collection. Its acquisition of MECC added The Oregon Trail, Word Munchers, Number Munchers and Storybook Weaver. With the acquisition of Broderbund, it obtained multiple award-winning brands including Carmen Sandiego, The Print Shop, Living Books, Family Tree Maker, Arthur, and KidPix.

Marketing 
According to founder Kevin O'Leary, SoftKey's business model was to market its retail products "no different from cat food or any other consumer good." It was one of few companies to rent space in stores to better manage distribution. O'Leary stated, "When we approach a retailer, we can offer them a wide range of titles that diversifies their risk. So if they give us five or 10 square feet of store space, we’ll guarantee X dollars of sell-through." He also said, "It's not about technology anymore. It's about marketing, merchandising, brand management, and shelf space. In the cat food business, that's all that matters. And in the software business, that's all that matters.''

The company pioneered revolving racks with software packaged in standard CD jewel cases, allowing them to display three times as much product. It took products out of niche software businesses and into general stores with more traffic such as Office Depot, Radio Shack, Willson Stationers and SmithBooks. It used eye-catching graphics on the boxes and made all of its packaging uniform. O'Leary believed that "What's inside the box is important, but it's not as important as how it's marketed." He stated that "It is truly a packaged goods philosophy that's taken over this industry. It's about facings and shelf space and advertising dollars and driving sales through the door and profit per square foot in gross margin."

In October 1995, SoftKey had 10 centers in cities in Europe, Asia, Canada, and the United States. It sold its products through more than 18,000 outlets, including grocery stores, hardware stores, and airport gift shops, and had distributors in 47 countries.

Pricing 
SoftKey's pricing strategy was to prioritize the number of copies sold over the price per unit. As such, SoftKey listed its titles for lower prices, generally between $40 and $100, with minimum profit. The Christian Science Monitor stated that the move could "transform the industry," leading to lower software prices but more variety in the types of stores that sell software.

The corporate mission of SoftKey International, Inc. was "to be the leading electronic publisher of value-priced consumer software-worldwide." One analyst dubbed its products "coasterware", since they were so cheap that "if you don't like the actual software you can use the CD-ROMs as drink coasters".

O'Leary wanted to "produce products to service that 40 percent of the market that hasn't bought educational software because of pricing issues." He stated, "In the last two years, we've moved from an industry that sells primarily to businesses to an industry that's going through a violent change to become a commodity.''

The company became known for aggressively driving down the development costs of products and laying off employees of the companies it acquired. Casey Dworkin, publisher of Retail Price Week, said that SoftKey appeals to companies that want to "sell software by the pound, appealing to impulse purchases by customers who are intrigued but don't want to drop $40 for a piece of software." They compared SoftKey's practices to a laundry-detergent maker marketing a premium-brand version, a lower-end brand, and a generic version of the same product.

SoftKey built a business by acquiring struggling software companies, repackaging and repricing its products. "SoftKey believes that much consumer software is overpriced and therefore cannot reach a broad market. It's a philosophy that clashes with the artistic sensibilities of many in the multimedia software business—but is nonetheless likely to become increasingly influential in the volatile software world."

Profit 
SoftKey Software Products was the fastest growing company in Canada in 1992, with sales of $36.8 million and profit of $6.1 million. Its most profitable products were its tax-software and processing service. By April 1995, SoftKey's stock was valued at $25.50, about 20 times the year's earnings. A public offering of 2.3 million common shares was priced at $28.875.

SoftKey products were sold in more than 19,000 stores in over 40 countries  In June of that year, Montgomery Securities raised more than $60 million for the company. In October, SoftKey raised another $350 million in an unrated private offering. On November 28, 1995, SoftKey rose from 3.2 million to 4.7 million shares, the largest increase in open positions among Nasdaq issues.

In August 1998, the stock exchange halted trading in The Learning Company, as the company issued a statement to clear up questions about its accounting practices. Shares of The Learning Company (NYSE: TLC) fell 1 15/16 to 26 3/8 and Mattel (NYSE: MAT) plunged 20 percent to 23 11/16. The company continued to grow, with revenue of $800 million despite an accumulated deficit of $1.1 billion by the end of 1998.

History 
In 1986, Canadian businessman and investor Kevin O'Leary along with John Freeman started SoftKey Software Products, Inc. in O'Leary's basement with a loan of $10,000 from his mother. He convinced other companies to bundle SoftKey's products with their own, later licensing software from other firms, which proved more cost-effective than internal development.

In 1993, SoftKey International was created out of a three-way merger between SoftKey Software Products, WordStar International, and Spinnaker Software. Shareholders of Softkey Software represented about 53 percent of the new company's shares. After the merger, the company moved to Spinnaker's offices in Cambridge, Mass.

Acquisitions

MECC and The Learning Company 

In October 1995, SoftKey initiated a bidding war against Broderbund for Learning Company, launching a hostile offer valued at $606 million. SoftKey also announced it had agreed to buy the Minnesota Educational Computing Corporation (MECC) for $370 million, throwing wrench into Broderbund's offer. O'Leary commented, "They're working on the economics of yesterday", stating that "Learning's premium-priced products were out of step with trends in the market."

After the acquisition of The Learning Company, SoftKey changed its name to "The Learning Company". A substantial percentage of the staff were let go, reducing it to a skeleton staff. MECC' senior vice president of product development Susan Schilling stated: "[O'Leary] had an interest in earning money. I'm not sure he had a desire to help children learn."

Acquisitions from 1994 to 1998 
On September 14, 1994, SoftKey acquired privately held Software Marketing Corp., Phoenix, for about 600,000 shares of SoftKey common stock and the assumption of $1.6 million in long-term debt.

On November 30, 1995, the original Learning Company announced that it had sued the Tribune Company for violating securities laws as a "strategic partner" of SoftKey International. The next day, SoftKey agreed to acquire Compton's New Media Inc. from Tribune for stock valued at $106.5 million.

In March 1998, Softkey, now called The Learning Company, acquired Mindscape Inc. from Pearson PLC for $150 million in cash and stock. Broderbund's Red Orb Entertainment was moved to Mindscape.

In June 1998, Learning Co. agreed to buy rival Broderbund Software Inc., maker of the blockbuster game Myst, in a stock deal valued at about $416 million.

In December 1998 ,The Learning Company acquired Palladium Interactive.

According to Information technology consulting company Booz Allen Hamilton, two of SoftKey International's acquisition deals rank among the ten worst U.S. acquisitions during 1994–1996 as measured by shareholder value two years after the deal.

Sale to Mattel 
In the fall of 1998, Mattel agreed to acquire The Learning Company in a stock-for-stock merger valuing the company at approximately $4.2 billion. The merger was finalized and unanimously approved by both companies' boards of directors on December 14. A few weeks after the sale, the Center for Financial Research and Analysis forensic accounting firm published a report critical of Mattel. O'Leary, who had been hired as president of Mattel's new TLC digital division, sold his stock for $6 million a few months before $2 billion in shareholder value was lost in one day.

Despite owning software titles through their Mattel Media division, Mattel lost $82.4 million in the year of 1998 because of several problems with the acquisition, including a loss of a key distribution deal and a high return of unsold products from retailers. The total financial losses to Mattel have been estimated to be as high as $3.6 billion.

On May 7, 1999, shareholders of both companies voted to approve the merger. The merger was completed on May 13, 1999. Jill E. Barad, Mattel's chairman and chief executive officer stated "This merger gives Mattel a $1 billion software division with an unparalleled portfolio of branded content and profit margins exceeding that of our traditional business," The company was placed under Mattel's new Mattel Interactive division.

Aftermath 
The sale proved to be fraught. The Telegraph deemed it "one of the worst takeovers in recent history". Toy analyst Margaret Whitfield of Tucker Anthony Cleary Gull called it "a disaster for Mattel". Bloomberg, Businessweek, and CNBC all described it as one of the worst mergers of all time.

In the fourth quarter of 1999, Mattel reported a loss of $184 million, reportedly due to poor sales and inventory problems. Michael Perik and Kevin O'Leary, founders and heads of the Learning Co, left the company. Reports from the Center for Financial Research and Analysis later highlighted the "lack of proper due diligence by Mattel during the Learning Co. acquisition."

In January 2000, Mattel brought on software executive and former Sega of America president Bernie Stolar to assist with their financial troubles. On February 3, 2000 Chairman and CEO Jill E. Barad resigned from Mattel. The 1999 Annual Report began, "The bad news for 1999 unfortunately has overshadowed the good news. We are all painfully aware of the negative effect the acquisition of The Learning Company and its subsequent performance had on our results for 1999" 

The acquisition saw the end of the mid-1990s edutainment boom. Former Learning Company educational design department manager, Toby Levenson, said that edutainment had become "a toxic word".  Blake Montgomery of EdSurge wrote, "For many years, people making educational products didn't want them to be entertaining because that could be called "edutainment" and that would hurt your funding.”

Sale to Gores Technology Group 
On April 3, 2000, Mattel announced its plan to dissolve its assets related to the software business. Gores Technology Group acquired The Learning Company to create their entertainment, productivity and education divisions, which became GAME Studios, The Learning Company, and Broderbund respectively. 
GAME Studios was sold to Ubisoft in 2001. Gores subsequently sold most of the other holdings – including the edutainment series and the brand name The Learning Company – to Irish company Riverdeep Interactive Learning, which later became Houghton Mifflin Harcourt. Harcourt released several book sets under The Learning Company brand umbrella, including Oregon Trail Adventures, The Little Box of Love, and The Little Box of Laughs.

As of April 2018, Houghton Mifflin Harcourt has ceased using the Learning Company brand.

List of acquisitions 
 February 1994 – WordStar International and Spinnaker Software
 June 1994 – Aris Multimedia Entertainment
 July 1994 – Compact Publishing
 September 1995 – Software Marketing Corporation
 July 1995 – Tewi Verlag GmbH
 August 1995 – Future Vision Holding
 December 1995 – The Learning Company
 December 1995 – Compton's NewMedia
 Late 1995 – EduSoft
 May 1996 – Minnesota Educational Computing Corporation (MECC)
 October 1997 – Microsystems Software
 December 1997 – Creative Wonders
 March 1998 – Mindscape
 August 1998 – Broderbund

Software titles

References

External links 
 

Defunct software companies of the United States
Mattel subsidiaries